KTNE may refer to:

 KTNE-FM, a radio station (91.1 FM) licensed to Alliance, Nebraska, United States
 KTNE-TV, a television station (channel 13 analog/24 digital) licensed to Alliance, Nebraska, United States